SS Thomas Nelson was a Liberty ship built in the United States during World War II. She was named after Thomas Nelson, an American planter, soldier, and statesman from Yorktown, Virginia. He represented Virginia in the Continental Congress and was its Governor in 1781. He is regarded as one of the Founding Fathers of the United States. He signed the United States Declaration of Independence as a member of the Virginia delegation and fought in the militia during the Siege of Yorktown.

Construction
Thomas Nelson was laid down on 10 December 1941, under a Maritime Commission (MARCOM) contract, MCE hull 30, by the Bethlehem-Fairfield Shipyard, Baltimore, Maryland; and was launched on 4 April 1942.

History
She was allocated to Calmar Steamship Corporation, on 12 May 1942.

A plane dropped a bomb then crashed into the after end of the ship. Two large explosions took place and fire broke out which could not be brought under control for two hours. The attack brought a frightful loss of life. Over 240 Army personnel were killed, wounded, or missing. Armed Guards also suffered casualties; three killed, two missing, and two wounded. But the Armed Guards continued to fight back at Japanese planes and, in fact, claimed the destruction of one plane on the afternoon of 12 November. In forty days the ship went through 241 air raids and alerts, destroyed two planes and helped bring down a third.

On 29 December 1949, she was laid up in the National Defense Reserve Fleet, Mobile, Alabama. On 26 June 1952, she was laid up in the National Defense Reserve Fleet, Wilmington, North Carolina. On 15 November 1956, she was withdrawn from the fleet for test conversion to diesel engine power. Bethlehem Steel, in Baltimore, performed the conversion and she was reclassified EC2-M-8b. At trials, in August 1956, she ran , well above the requested .

After conversion she was transferred to the Military Sea Transportation Service. She was operated by United States Lines under a bareboat charter on the same route as another converted Liberty ship, . Benjamin Chew had been refit with steam turbines in order to compare efficiencies of various conversions. While both ship were able to run on Bunker C fuel oil, Thomas Nelson consumed less than half of Benjamin Chew while traveling at a higher speed and carrying more cargo.

On 17 June 1960, she was laid up in the James River Reserve Fleet, Lee Hall, Virginia. She was sold for nontransportation use on 28 March 1972, to Buckley & Company, Inc., for $115,001. She was removed from the fleet, 5 April 1972.

Buckley & Company converted her to a dredger and pipe laying ship and renamed her Beverley M. She was laid up in Hoboken, New Jersey, in 1976, and scrapped in 1981.

See also
SS Jeremiah M. Daily

References

Bibliography

 
 
 
 
 
 

 

Liberty ships
1942 ships
Ships built in Baltimore
Mobile Reserve Fleet
Wilmington Reserve Fleet
James River Reserve Fleet